Lola the Truck Driver (Spanish:Lola la trailera) is a 1983 Mexican action film directed by Raúl Fernández and starring Rosa Gloria Chagoyán, Rolando Fernández and Irma Serrano. After her father is murdered, a young woman begins driving his truck so it won't be repossessed. With the help of an undercover detective, she tackles a major drugs baron.

The film was a major commercial success on its release, earning $1 million in Mexico and $2.5 million in the United States. This represented a large profit for its backers who had spent $150,000 on the production. Several sequels starring Rosa Gloria Chagoyán as Lola followed beginning with The Kidnapping of Lola in 1986, as well as other films that tried to copy its style.

Plot 
Lola is the daughter of a truck driver who is killed by a drug gang after he refuses to smuggle drugs across the US-Mexico border. Lola inherits the truck, and seeks justice by fighting the gang with the assistance of an undercover agent.

Cast
 Rosa Gloria Chagoyán as Lola Chagano  
 Rolando Fernández as Jorge Stander, undercover detective  
 Irma Serrano as Flor de Lotos / Alondra  
 Emilio Fernández as Leoncio's Bodyguard  
 Edna Bolkan as Leoncio's Girl  
 Milton Rodríguez as Leoncio Cardenas, drug lord  
 María Cardinal as Leoncio's Girl 
 Sergio Ramos as Customer at Ana Paula's
 Carmelina Encinas as Leoncio's Girl  
 Miguel Manzano as Lola's Father 
 Roberto Cañedo as Chief of Police Detectives  
 Ricardo Carrión as Trailer Driver in Brawl 
 Ismael Rojas as Leoncio's Bodyguard  
 Manolo Fregoso
 Gerardo Martínez
 Ernesto Pruneda
 Lola Manzano as Leoncio's Girl  
 Manuel Garza
 Enrique Diaz M.
 Ruben Fernandez
 Fausto Calvo
 Juan Carlos Talamantes
 Isaias Valdez as  
 José Reyes
 Juan Cruz Gonzalez
 Famie Kaufman as Ana Paula 
 Joaquín García Vargas as Lola's Godfather 
 Socorro Bonilla as Leoncio's Girl  
 Charly Valentino as Customer at Ana Paula's  
 Lucía Gálvez as Leoncio's Girl 
 Paco Sañudo as Gay at Ana Paula's  
 Carlos East as Leoncio's Bodyguard 
 Salvador Julian as Leoncio's Bodyguard 
 Nora Larraga 'Karla' as Leoncio's Girl

References

Bibliography 
 Mora, Carl J. Mexican Cinema: Reflections of a Society, 1896-2004. McFarland & Co, 2005.

External links 
 

1983 films
1983 action films
Mexican action films
1980s Spanish-language films
Films directed by Raúl Fernández
1980s Mexican films